Transmembrane protein 155 is a protein that in humans is encoded by the TMEM155 gene. It is located on human chromosome 4, spanning 6,497 bases. It is also referred to as FLJ30834 and LOC132332. This protein is known to be expressed mainly in the brain, placenta, and lymph nodes and is conserved throughout most placental mammals. The function and structure of this protein is still not well understood, but its level of expression has been studied pertaining to various pathologies.

Gene

Locus 
TMEM155 is located on the minus strand of human chromosome 4 (4q27) and spans 13,611 base pairs.

Genetic Neighborhood 
Cytogenetic band: 4q27

TMEM155 is neighbored by TMEM155 is neighbored on chromosome 4 by CCNA2, a gene encoding for cyclin A2, and ANXA5, which encodes annexin A5. It is also neighbored by PP12613 located on the positive strand.

Size 
The gene on chromosome 4 encoding for TMEM155 spans 6,487 nucleotides. This gene spans from base pairs 121,758,930 and 121,765,427 on chromosome 4. The longest variant ofTMEM155 has 5 exons detailed in the table below:

mRNA

Isoforms 
There are 7 isoforms of TMEM155 precursor mRNA. TMEM155 isoform 5 is the longest mRNA and is 2,429 bp long. The shortest isoform is variant 4 and this variant is 2,035 bp long. Isoforms are detailed in the table below.

Protein

Primary Structure 
TMEM155 protein is 130 amino acids in length. The TMEM155 protein in its full form is 14.2 kD in molecular weight with an isoelectric point of 10.29 Without its signal peptide it is 11.8 kD. The protein interacts with the membrane once, with one transmembrane domain as seen below.

Secondary Structure 
TMEM155 has a secondary structure composed of 23.5% alpha-helices, 67% beta-sheets, 9.5% turns and coils.

Tertiary structure 

The tertiary structure of TMEM155 is predicted in the image on the right. This is predicted to be the structure of the N-terminus tail of TMEM155 located inside the ER membrane.

Post-translational modifications 
TMEM155 has sites for O-glycosylation at ser78, thr79, and pro80. It has sites for O-GlcNac at thr79 and ser121 It is a target for sumoylation from ile126 to val130. There is a glycation site at lys102.

Subcellular Localization 
TMEM155 contains a sequence which functions as an ER retention signal.

Interacting Proteins 
TMEM155 interacts with LMBR1 and TMEM259.  LMBR1 is a known lipocalin transmembrane receptor. TMEM259 is another transmembrane protein.

Regulation

Gene Level Regulation 
There are several promoters of the TMEM155 gene. The promoter region of the gene is bound by several transcription factors involved in regulating chromatin structure, development, cell cycle, and immune responses. TMEM155 is expressed highly in the brain, placenta, and lymph nodes. Below is a table detailing the transcription factor binding sites for the GXP_319937 promoter of TMEM155. The table below details the transcription factors that bind the promoter region of TMEM155 and the sequences which they bind.

Transcript Level Regulation 
There are 4 splice enhancers of TMEM155. These enhancer sites come on the 5' end of the TMEM155 gene and contain binding sites for transcription factors RCOR1, MILLT1, SIN3A, NFIC, STAT3, JUNB, FOS, EGR1, PHB2, RUNX3, and SRF. Many of these transcription factors are involved with regulation cell growth and tumor suppression.

Mutations 
There are several notable SNPs in the coding sequence of TMEM155. These mutations include mostly missense and nonsense mutations.  The table below summarizes the mutations found in TMEM155 in the conserved bases.

Evolution 

TMEM155 is evolving at the molecular level rather quickly. When compared to fibrinogen protein rate of evolution, the TMEM155 appears to be accumulating more amino acid changes in a shorter amount of time. Because it is faster than the quickly evolving fibrinogen, it is also evolving faster than cytochrome C protein, which is known to evolve slowly.

Homology 
TMEM155 is conserved across most placental mammals. DoD (MYA) refers to how many million years ago the gene diverged from the human version of the gene.

Clinical significance

Ocular tissues 
The upregulation of TMEM155 has been found in basal cell nevus syndrome fibroblasts. TMEM155 was also found to be upregulated in corneal keratinocytes, which could contribute to the upregulation of the gene being associated with nystagmus.

Brain tissues 
TMEM155 regulation co-varies with families that have incidences of essential tremor,

Female reproductive tissues 
Hypermethylated TMEM155 is a potential biomarker for HER2+ breast cancer. The expression of TMEM155 was found to be higher in the oocytes of women with low antral follicular count, meaning it could be involved in the regulation of female fertility.

References 

Transmembrane proteins